Sandouping is a town in Yiling District of Yichang prefecture-level city in the Chinese province of Hubei. It is located on the right (southern) bank of the Yangtze River, next to Yiling District's border with Zigui County to the west.  Sandouping is best known as the location of the Three Gorges Dam, which is the world's largest electricity-generating plant of any kind.

History
The predecessor of today's Sandouping, the village of Huangniupu (黄牛铺, "Yellow Cow Post Station") was established during the reign of the Hongzhi Emperor in 1496. Sandouping District was created in March 1949 and transformed into Sandouping Town in February 1984.

Sandouping used to be a small fishing village until it was selected to be the site of the Three Gorges Dam.
In 1999, at the peak of the construction, over 40,000 workers lived in Sandouping.
At the time, special permits were required to enter the town.

Six out of nineteen Sandouping's villages are populated by families that have been resettled from the areas flooded by the waters of the Three Gorges Reservoir, or, earlier, the Gezhouba Reservoir.

Geography
The Town of Sandouping occupies 178 km2 on the right (southern) bank of the Yangtze River,  opposite the town of Letianxi, to which it is connected by Xiling Bridge.
Sandouping is the only town in Yiling District that is located south of the river.

Sandouping's western neighbor is the town of Maoping, the county seat of the nearby Zigui County. Although it is only a kilometer or two west of the dam (straight-line distance), it is actually several kilometers drive on Hubei Provincial Route 134, because of the terrain.

Administratively, the Town of Sandouping is divided into 19 villages and 1 neighborhood committee. Sandouping's central urban area, where the town government and most services are located, is technically known as Yuanyi Village. It is situated some 5 km east of the southern end of the Three Gorges Dam.
The neighborhood just to the east, known as Huanglingmiao Village, is named after Huangling Temple located there near the Yangtze River waterfront. It is being developed as a tourism area, centered around the riverboat dock.

A secondary center of economic activity in the town is located in its western part, within walking distance from the service entrance to the Three Gorges Dam (Gaojiachong Village and Sandouping residential community).

Administrative Divisions
One residential community:
 Sandouping

Nineteen villages:
 Huanglingmiao, Huangniuyan, Nantuo, Yuanyi, Qipanshan, Zhongbao/bu/pu, Gaojiachong, Shiban, Qiuqianping, Huajipo, Dongyuemiao, Xinsheng, Shipai, Tianqiao, Zhemuping, Wuhe, Toudingshi, Muyang, Baiguotang

Economy
The town's economy is closely connected to the Yangtze River. Besides the Three Gorges Dam, major local enterprises include Hailun Shipyard and Fazhong Vessel Servicing Company.

The three main agricultural products of Sandouping are citrus fruits (according to different governmental sources, 15,000 mu [ 1,000 hectares] or 10535 mu [702 ha] under cultivation, with an annual harvest of 14,000 metric tons), silkworms (14400 mu/ 960 ha of mulberry plantations), and tea (3316 mu/ 221 ha).

The town's authorities are working on expanding tourism in the area.

Gallery

See also
List of township-level divisions of Hubei

References

Township-level divisions of Hubei
Geography of Yichang
Towns in China